The Soul's Cycle is a dramatic film, directed by Ulysses Davis and released in 1916.

A fragment of the film survives, held by the Library of Congress.

Plot
Nadia, the daughter of a nobleman, rejects ancient Greece's senator Theron'''s love; so he has her and her lover, Lucian thrown into a burning crater. As punishment for this sin, the gods decree that he will roam the earth as a lion until he can right his wrong. A few millennia later, Nadia is now Agnes, the daughter of a millionaire, and Lucian is Arthur'', a Wall Street broker.

Cast
 Patricia Palmer
 John Oaker
 George Clair
 George Stanley
 Roy Watson

References

External links

1916 films
American black-and-white films
American silent feature films
1916 drama films
Silent American drama films
1910s American films